The prefecture of Tangier-Asilah (Berber: ⵟⴰⵏⵊⴰ - ⴰⵣⵉⵍⴰ) is a largely urban subdivision of the Tanger-Tetouan-Al Hoceima region of Morocco. Located in the north of the country, on the Atlantic coast. it had  inhabitants in 2004 and  inhabitants in 2014.

Towns of the province

See also